Captain Hubert Henry de Burgh, DSO, RN (16 February 1879 in Naas, County Kildare, Ireland – 6 October 1960 in Naas) was an Irish cricketer and Officer in the Royal Navy. A right-handed batsman, he played just once for the Ireland national cricket team, a first-class match against Oxford University in June 1926.

Earlier in his life, he played a first-class match in India for a "Europeans" team against a Hindus team in February 1906.

Commissioned into the Royal Navy in 1893, Hubert de Burgh was posted as a lieutenant to the HMS Britannia in January 1903. He served in India as Aide de Camp (ADC) to the King at the Delhi Durbar in 1911 and in St Petersburg. During the Great War he commanded destroyers and was made a Companion of the Distinguished Service Order for bravery at sea in 1917 as well as being twice mentioned in despatches. After commanding the Admiralty Yacht and serving in the mediterranean, Captain de Burgh retired in 1923 until he rejoined the RN in 1939.

Captain de Burgh was the eldest son of Colonel Thomas John de Burgh, DL, JP of Oldtown, Naas, County Kildare (1851–1931)and Emily, daughter of Baron de Robeck. He was the brother of Captain Charles de Burgh DSO, RN, a submarine commander and Lieutenant Tom de Burgh of the 31st Duke of Connaught's Own Lancers who was killed in action in 1914.

The de Burghs of Oldtown have been at Oldtown since the house was built by Colonel Thomas de Burgh, architect of Trinity College Dublin Library, The Custom House, The Royal Barracks and St Steven's Hospital in Dublin. Hubert de Burgh and descendants are the only remaining direct descendants of William de Burgh who first settled in Ireland in 1185.

References

1879 births
1960 deaths
Irish cricketers
People from Naas
Sportspeople from County Kildare
Europeans cricketers
Royal Navy officers of World War I